Drumlaghy (from ) is a small village and townland in County Fermanagh, Northern Ireland. In the 2001 Census it had a population (with Florencecourt) of 135 people. It is situated within Fermanagh and Omagh district, near the listed building Florence Court.

References 

Villages in County Fermanagh
Townlands of County Fermanagh
Fermanagh and Omagh district